Nepal 1 is the first Nepali language satellite channel from India. Nepal 1 is primarily targeted towards homes of the Nepalese community outside Nepal in North Bengal, Sikkim and North Eastern States in India, the whole of Myanmar, Singapore and Malaysia, right up to Hong Kong.

Nepal 1’s line-up is designed for family viewing with its programming schedule of diverse news, sports, movies, comedy and investigative specials from Nepal and India.

External links
 Official site

Television stations in India
Television channels and stations established in 2003